Ilona Massey (born Ilona Hajmássy, June 16, 1910 – August 20, 1974) was a Hungarian-American film, stage and radio performer.

Early life and career
She was born in Budapest, Kingdom of Hungary (now in Hungary). Billed as "the new Dietrich", she acted in three films with Nelson Eddy, including Rosalie (1937), and with Lon Chaney Jr. in Frankenstein Meets the Wolf Man (1943) as Baroness Frankenstein.  In 1943, she appeared in the Ziegfeld Follies.

In 1947, she starred with Eddy in Northwest Outpost, a musical film composed by Rudolf Friml. In 1949, she starred in Love Happy with the Marx Brothers. She played Madame Egelichi, a femme fatale spy, and her performance inspired Milton Caniff in the creation of his femme fatale spy, Madame Lynx, in the comic strip "Steve Canyon". Caniff hired Massey to pose for him.

In 1950, Massey was one of the stars of the NBC spy show Top Secret on radio. In 1952 she began starring in Rendezvous on ABC television. The program was described in a magazine article as "a mystery-drama with plenty of glamour thrown in."

Beginning on November 1, 1954, she hosted DuMont's The Ilona Massey Show, a weekly musical variety show in which she sang songs with guests in a nightclub set, with music provided by the Irving Fields Trio. The series ended January 3, 1955, after 10 episodes.

Recognition
Massey has a star at 1623 Vine Street on the Hollywood Walk of Fame. It was dedicated February 8, 1960.

Politics
Becoming an American citizen in 1946, she remained strongly anti-communist for what she saw as the destruction of her native country, at one point picketing the United Nations during the 1959 visit of Soviet premier Nikita Khrushchev. A registered Republican, she supported the campaign of Dwight D. Eisenhower in the 1952 presidential election.

Death

Massey died of cancer in Bethesda, Maryland, and is buried in Virginia's Arlington National Cemetery near her last husband, Donald Dawson, who had served in the United States Air Force Reserve as a major general.

References

Filmography

External links 

1910 births
1974 deaths
American film actresses
American radio actresses
American stage actresses
American television actresses
Deaths from cancer in Maryland
Hungarian emigrants to the United States
People from Bethesda, Maryland
Actresses from Budapest
Burials at Arlington National Cemetery
20th-century American actresses
California Republicans
Maryland Republicans